KEGS-LD, virtual channel 30 (UHF digital channel 24), is a low-powered television station licensed to Las Vegas, Nevada, United States. The station is owned by HC2 Holdings.

History 
The station's construction permit was issued on January 12, 2007 under the calls of KEGS-LP. It changed to the current KEGS-LD on February 5, 2007.

Digital channels
The station's digital signal is multiplexed:

References

External links

Low-power television stations in the United States
Innovate Corp.
Television stations in Nevada
Television channels and stations established in 2007
2007 establishments in Nevada